Robert Randles (12 February 1888 – 8 or 9 October 1916) was an English professional footballer who played as an inside left in the Football League for Chesterfield Town.

Personal life 
Randles served as a private in the 16th Battalion (Canadian Scottish), CEF during the First World War and was killed on 8 or 9 October 1916. He was buried in Adanac Military Cemetery, France.

Career statistics

References

English Football League players
1888 births
1916 deaths
Sportspeople from Birkenhead
Liverpool F.C. players
Tranmere Rovers F.C. players
Chesterfield F.C. players
Association football inside forwards
Canadian military personnel killed in World War I
Canadian Expeditionary Force soldiers
English footballers
Burials at Adanac Military Cemetery
Military personnel from Merseyside